River House is a co-op apartment building located at 435 East 52nd Street in Manhattan, New York City.

History
The 26-story River House was constructed in 1931 on the site of a former cigar factory and designed by William Lawrence Bottomley in the Art Deco style. Designed for cooperative ownership, the building featured 78 apartments with 12-rooms, 6 baths, and two fireplaces. Originally, the building featured a pier where residents could dock their yachts, but that amenity was lost with the construction of the FDR Drive. The building has a gated cobblestone courtyard featuring a fountain. 

During the Great Depression, residents defaulted on mortgage interest payments and the court ruled the property could be sold as a foreclosure in 1941. In 1948, the building was bought by Tishman Realty & Construction who wanted to split the suites into 170 smaller apartments. Tenants opposed the renovations and sought legal counsel to retain their apartments intact.

Historically, the co-op board was notorious for turning away applicants who failed to meet strict liquidity requirements or those whose "comings and goings would attract unwelcome publicity to the River House". Famously, Gloria Vanderbilt was rejected by the board in 1980. She accused the board of racism (she was in a relationship with African-American singer Bobby Short), while the board claimed she had been rejected on her merits. Other celebrities alleged to have been rejected by the board include Richard Nixon, Joan Crawford, Diane Keaton, and in 2014, the French Ambassador to the United Nations, François Delattre.

The River Club
Parts of the lower levels of the building are leased to the River Club, a private club that counts slightly more than half of the building's shareholders among its 900 or so members. It was the first social club with well-known members to accept both men and women. It featured a swimming pool, terrace overlooking the East River, tennis courts, and a ballroom.

 the members, who include David H. Koch and Aerin Lauder, pay approximately $10,000 in annual membership fees. The club includes a restaurant, an indoor pool and tennis courts.

After several years of negotiations where the club attempted to negotiate the purchase of its space, the co-op board listed the club's space for sale as a private residence. If the asking price is met, it would be Manhattan's most expensive residence.

Notable residents
 Cornelius Vanderbilt Whitney, businessman, film producer, philanthropist, polo player, government official, and owner of thoroughbred racehorses.
 Edwin Howard Armstrong, inventor of FM radio
 Helen Bonfils and George Somnes, Broadway producers
 Catherine "Deeda" (Gerlach) Blair, wife of ambassador William McCormick Blair, Jr.
 Donald M. Blinken, ambassador
 Philip Bobbitt, author, academic
 Barbara Taylor Bradford, author
Ferdinand Eberstadt, investment banker
Walter Hoving, businessman and former chairman of Tiffany & Co.
 Henry Kissinger, United States Secretary of State
 Isabel Leighton, actress and writer
 Joshua Logan, writer and director
Malcolm Muir, magazine industrialist
 Alexandra Penney, author and magazine editor
 Holly Peterson, author
 Peter George Peterson, businessman and United States Secretary of Commerce
 Kermit Roosevelt, explorer and son of Theodore Roosevelt
 Robert Rosenkranz
Quentin Reynolds, journalist
 Uma Thurman, actress
 Kiliaen Van Rensselaer, businessman

References

1931 establishments in New York City
Apartment buildings in New York City
Art Deco architecture in Manhattan
Condominiums and housing cooperatives in Manhattan
Midtown Manhattan
Residential buildings completed in 1931